Laverbread (or) is a food product made from laver, an edible seaweed (littoral alga) consumed mainly in Wales as part of local traditional cuisine. It is smooth in texture and forms delicate, sheetlike thalli, often clinging to rocks. Porphyra (laver seaweed) is classified as red algae; it tends to be a brownish colour, but boils down to a dark green pulp when prepared. Laver seaweed has a high content of dietary minerals, particularly iodine and iron. The high iodine content gives the seaweed a distinctive flavour in common with olives and oysters.

Laver seaweed has been cultivated as a food in Wales since at least the 17th century. It is prepared by repeated washings and then boiling until it becomes the soft purée-like product known as laverbread. The gelatinous paste that results can then be sold as it is or rolled in oatmeal. It is sometimes also coated with oatmeal prior to frying. Laverbread is traditionally eaten fried with bacon and cockles as part of a Welsh breakfast or, in the southwest of England, with hog's pudding.

Cultivation
Cultivation of laver seaweed as food is thought to be very ancient, though the first mention was in William Camden's Britannia in the early 17th century. It is plucked from the rocks and given a preliminary rinse in clear water. The collected laver seaweed is repeatedly washed to remove sand, then boiled until it becomes a stiff, green purée with a smooth consistency. Alternatively, steaming is utilised, which speeds up the process. Once prepared, the seaweed can be preserved for about a week. During the 18th century, the product was packed into a crock and sold as "potted laver".

Laver seaweed cultivation is typically associated with Wales, and it is still gathered off the Pembrokeshire and Carmarthenshire coasts, although similar farming methods are used at the west coast of Scotland.

Laverbread can be eaten cold as a salad with lamb or mutton. A simple preparation is to heat the laverbread and to add butter and the juice of a lemon or Seville orange. Laverbread can be heated and served with boiled bacon.

The alga

Laverbread is made from the seaweed Porphyra umbilicalis from the genus Porphyra and family Bangiaceae. It is smooth in texture and forms delicate, sheetlike thalli, often clinging to rocks. Porphyra is classified as red algae; it tends to be a brownish colour, but boils down to a dark green pulp when prepared. It is unusual amongst seaweeds because the fronds are only one cell thick. Laver has a high content of dietary minerals, particularly iodine and iron. The high iodine content gives the seaweed a distinctive flavour in common with olives and oysters.

Preparation
Laverbread ( or ) is a traditional Welsh delicacy made from laver seaweed. To make laverbread, the seaweed is boiled for several hours, then minced or pureed. The gelatinous paste that results can then be sold as it is, or rolled in oatmeal; it is sometimes coated with oatmeal prior to frying.

Laverbread is traditionally eaten fried with bacon and cockles as part of a Welsh breakfast. It can also be used to make a sauce to accompany lamb, crab, monkfish, etc., and to make laver soup. Richard Burton has been quoted as describing laverbread as "Welshman's caviar".

Laver seaweed is often associated with Penclawdd and its cockles, being used traditionally in the Welsh diet and is still eaten widely across Wales in the form of laverbread. In addition to Wales, laverbread is eaten across the Bristol Channel in North Devon, especially the Exmoor coast around Lynmouth, Combe Martin and Ilfracombe. In North Devon it is generally not cooked with oatmeal and is simply referred to as 'laver'.

Laverbread is highly nutritious because of its high proportions of protein, iron, and especially iodine. The dried purple (nori) variation is the main plant that contains significant amounts of vitamin B12, which makes it the most suitable source of vitamin B12 available for vegans; consuming 4g of dried purple laver provides the RDA of vitamin B12.

See also
  – another edible seaweed

References

Bibliography
Lamb, Leeks and Laverbread, Gilli Davies, Grafton (16 Mar 1989), 

Bangiophyceae
Welsh cuisine
Edible seaweeds
Species described in 1753
Taxa named by Friedrich Traugott Kützing